Sirpa Helena Laine (born March 30, 1955 in Helsinki) is a retired female javelin thrower from Finland. She competed for her native country at the 1984 Summer Olympics, finishing in 11th place (58.18 metres).

Achievements

References
 

1955 births
Living people
Athletes from Helsinki
Finnish female javelin throwers
Olympic athletes of Finland
Athletes (track and field) at the 1984 Summer Olympics